Thomson Township is a township in Carlton County, Minnesota, United States. The population was 5,003 as of the 2010 census. Thomson Township took its name from the city of Thomson.

Interstate 35 and Carlton County Road 61 are two of the main routes in the township.

The community of Esko is located within Thomson Township.

Geography
According to the United States Census Bureau, the township has a total area of 39.9 mi (103.3 km), of which 39.7 mi (102.7 km) is land and 0.2 mi (0.6 km) (0.63%) is water.

The east quarter of the city of Scanlon and the north three-quarters of the city of Thomson are located within Thomson Township geographically but are separate entities.

The Saint Louis River flows through at the western edge of Thomson Township.

The Midway River and Crystal Creek both flow through Thomson Township.

Unincorporated communities
 Esko
 Harney

Major highway
  Interstate 35

Lakes
 Forbay Lake – vast majority of the lake located within the township

Adjacent townships, cities, and communities
The following municipalities and communities are adjacent to Thomson Township :

 Solway Township, St. Louis County (north)
 Midway Township, St. Louis County (east)
 Twin Lakes Township (southwest)
 Brevator Township, St. Louis County (northwest)
 The city of Cloquet (west)

Jay Cooke State Park is to the immediate south of Thomson Township.

Cemeteries
The township contains three cemeteries, Finnish Apostolic, Saint Matthew's and Thomson, which are all still in use today and one cemetery that is no longer platted, the Pioneer Cemetery at Jay Cooke State Park.

Demographics
As of the census of 2000, there were 4,361 people, 1,527 households, and 1,244 families residing in the township. The racial makeup of the township was 97.89% White, 0.21% African American, 0.62% Native American, 0.60% Asian, 0.02% from other races, and 0.66% from two or more races. Hispanic or Latino of any race were 0.41% of the population. 26.0% were of Finnish, 13.5% Norwegian, 11.1% Swedish and 6.5% Irish ancestry.

There were 1,527 households, out of which 41.5% had children under the age of 18 living with them, 73.4% were married couples living together, 5.6% had a female householder with no husband present, and 18.5% were non-families. 15.1% of all households were made up of individuals, and 5.6% had someone living alone who was 65 years of age or older.  The average household size was 2.85 and the average family size was 3.18.

In the township the population was spread out, with 29.3% under the age of 18, 6.2% from 18 to 24, 29.6% from 25 to 44, 25.6% from 45 to 64, and 9.3% who were 65 years of age or older.  The median age was 37 years. For every 100 females, there were 101.5 males.  For every 100 females age 18 and over, there were 101.5 males.

The median income for a household in the township was $53,026, and the median income for a family was $58,977. Males had a median income of $44,547 versus $25,270 for females. The per capita income for the township was $20,045.  About 3.2% of families and 5.4% of the population were below the poverty line, including 7.4% of those under age 18 and 4.4% of those age 65 or over.

References
 United States National Atlas
 United States Census Bureau 2007 TIGER/Line Shapefiles
 United States Board on Geographic Names (GNIS)

External links
Township website

Townships in Carlton County, Minnesota
Townships in Minnesota